Estas Tonne (born 24 April 1975) is a musician who describes himself as a "modern day troubadour".

Biography
Born Stanislav Tonne in 1975 in the Ukrainian Soviet Socialist Republic, he is of Jewish and German ancestry. He took up the guitar at the age of eight and started to study classical music at the local music school. After his family moved to Israel in 1990, Tonne stopped playing for 11 years. In September 2001, he moved to New York and resumed playing the guitar in a duo with violinist and street musician Michael Shulman. He eventually began to travel around the world as a solo musician.
Tonne plays concerts in countries across the world, as well as performing at street, yoga, art, or other festivals. Estas plays a 6-stringed classical guitar as well as the flute.
He is vegetarian. He has rarely stayed for more than a year at one place as an adult.

Partial discography
Studio albums
 Black and White World (2002)
 Dragon of Delight, Vol. II (2004)
 13 Songs of Truth (2008)
 Bohemian Skies (2009)
 Place of the Gods (2011)
 Internal Flight (2013)
 Mother of Souls - Soundscape of Life (Estas Tonne & One Heart Family) (2016)

Live albums
 The Inside Movie (2012)
 Live in Odeon (2012)
 Internal Flight (Live at Garavasara) (2013)
 Live in ULM – Outer ◦ Inner - double album (2018)
 Space Creation (feat. Jonatan Bar Rashi – Live in Zurich) (2021)

References

External links

 Official website
 

Flamenco guitarists
Folk guitarists
1975 births
Living people
People from Zaporizhzhia
Ukrainian folk guitarists
Ukrainian guitarists
Ukrainian jazz guitarists
Ukrainian musicians
Ukrainian people of German descent
21st-century guitarists